The 3rd Luftwaffe Field Division was an infantry division of the Luftwaffe branch of the Wehrmacht that fought in World War II. It was formed using surplus ground crew of the Luftwaffe and served on the Eastern Front from late 1942 to early 1944 at which time it was disbanded.

Operational history

The 3rd Luftwaffe Field Division, one of several such divisions of the Luftwaffe, was formed in mid-1942 in Gross-Born Troop Maneuver Area, under the command of Generalmajor Robert Pistorious. Intended to serve as infantry, its personnel were largely drawn from surplus Luftwaffe (German Air Force) ground crew.

Towards the end of 1942, the division was assigned to Army Group Centre on the Eastern Front and fought in engagements at Nevel from November 1942 to October 1943. Responsibility for the division was transferred to the Army on 1 November 1943 and designated 3rd Field Division (L). Later that month, it participated in actions at Vitebsk against the Soviet Army and remained on the front lines until January 1944. Shortly afterwards, after suffering heavy losses in the fighting at Vitebsk, the division was disbanded. Surviving personnel were absorbed by the 4th and 6th Luftwaffe Field Divisions.

Commanders
Generalmajor Robert Pistorius (Sep 1942 – Jan 1944).

Notes
Footnotes

Citations

References

Luftwaffe Field Divisions
Military units and formations established in 1942
Military units and formations disestablished in 1944
1942 establishments in Germany
1944 disestablishments in Germany